Concert of Intrigue is a 1954 Italian historical melodrama film directed by Mario Bonnard and starring Brigitte Bardot.

It recorded admissions of 959,000 in France.

Plot 
During the First World War, Enrico and Franco, two brothers of the noble Alberti family of Rovereto, found themselves on opposite sides: the older Enrico, physically handicapped, is pro-Austrian while the younger Franco is a fervent patriot who thanks to his career as a pianist can move freely between the two countries. Despite a relationship with Elisabetta Tabor, a Polish singer, Franco decides to marry the young Anna, the niece of a police lieutenant, but Enrico is also interested in her. Henry driven by jealousy, backed by Elisabetta who is actually a spy of the Austrians, they convince his brother that his arrest is imminent and he must flee to Italy where he joins the army and returns to fight in the Rovereto area and finds Anna who in the meanwhile she gave birth to a baby boy. The woman hides her husband but once again her brother Enrico discovers him and denounces him only to repent himself accusing himself of being a saboteur and replacing him in the death sentence. After the war Franco comes out of prison and reunites with Anna and her son.

Cast
 Lucia Bosè  as Elisabeth Tatabor  
 Pierre Cressoy  as Franco Alberti  
 Brigitte Bardot as Anna  
 Giorgio Albertazzi  as Count Enrico Alberti 
 Camillo Pilotto as Don Eugenio 
 Henri Vidon as Lt. Schumann  
 Tonio Selwart  as General Renner
 Diana Lante  as Countess Eleonora Alberti
 Vera Carmi as Nurse

References

External links

1954 films
Films directed by Mario Bonnard
1950s Italian-language films
Italian historical drama films
1950s historical drama films
1954 drama films
Italian black-and-white films
Melodrama films
1950s Italian films